Leslie Ullman (born 1947) is an American poet and professor. She is the author of four poetry collections, most recently, Progress on the Subject of Immensity (University of New Mexico Press, 2013). Her third book, Slow Work Through Sand (University of Iowa Press, 1997), was co-winner of the 1997 Iowa Poetry Prize. Other honors include winning the 1978 Yale Series of Younger Poets Competition for her first book, Natural Histories, and two NEA fellowships. Her poems have been published in literary journals and magazines including The New Yorker, Poetry, The Kenyon Review, Puerto Del Sol, Blue Mesa Review, and in anthologies including Five Missouri Poets (Chariton Review Press, 1979).

Biography
Ullman was born in Illinois and graduated from Skidmore College. She earned her MFA from University of Iowa Writers' Workshop. She established, taught at, and for many years directed the bilingual MFA in Creative Writing Program at the University of Texas at El Paso, where she remains a professor emerita. She is currently on the faculty of the Vermont College of Fine Arts MFA in the Creative Writing Program, and lives in northern New Mexico, with her husband, Erik Ranger.

Bibliography 
 Library of Small Happiness  (3:A Taos Press, 2017)
 Progress on the Subject of Immensity (University of New Mexico Press, 2013)
 Slow Work Through Sand (University of Iowa Press, 1997)
 Dreams by No One's Daughter (University of Pittsburgh Press, 1987)
 Natural Histories (Yale University Press, 1979)

Honors and awards
 1997 Iowa Poetry Prize
 1989 National Endowment for the Arts Fellowship
 1976 National Endowment for the Arts Fellowship
 1978 Yale Series of Younger Poets Competition

References

External links
 Official website
 Poem: Academy of American Poets > Peace by Leslie Ullman
 Audio Reading: The Writer's Almanac with Garrison Keillor > June 30, 1998 > French by Leslie Ullman
 Audio Reading: Leslie Ullman Reading at Poetry Festival
 Faculty Bio: The University of Texas at El Paso > Creative Writing Department
 Faculty Bio: Vermont College of Fine Arts > Creative Writing Program
 Author Page: University of Iowa Press 
 Interview: The Common
 Essay: Dark Star

1947 births
Living people
American women poets
Iowa Writers' Workshop alumni
National Endowment for the Arts Fellows
Poets from Illinois
Poets from New Mexico
Skidmore College alumni
The New Yorker people
University of Texas at El Paso faculty
Vermont College of Fine Arts faculty
Yale Younger Poets winners
American women academics
21st-century American women